Americano is a 2011 French drama film written and directed by Mathieu Demy. Demy also stars alongside Geraldine Chaplin, Salma Hayek and Chiara Mastroianni. Demy's mother, Agnès Varda, who was also a filmmaker, served as a producer on the project. The film received its première at the 2011 Toronto International Film Festival on 8 September 2011 and  later that month, was also screened at the San Sebastián International Film Festival, where it competed for the Kutxa-New Directors Award. In October it was played at the 55th BFI London Film Festival.

Plot

In Paris, the relationship between Martin (Demy) and Claire (Mastroianni) is at an impasse. His mother's death suddenly calls Martin back to Los Angeles, the town where he spent his childhood, to deal with inheritance formalities. In Los Angeles he is helped by a family friend, Linda, who takes him to his mother's home and the neighbourhood he grew up in. This return to childhood haunts provokes several buried memories that appear to disturb Martin. After speaking with a neighbour, Martin goes to Tijuana in Mexico, looking for Lola (Hayek), a close friend of his mother's. He tracks her down to the Americano, a club where Lola works as a dancer. However, to find resolution, Martin must face up to his past.

Cast
Mathieu Demy as Martin
Salma Hayek as Lola
Geraldine Chaplin as Linda
Chiara Mastroianni as Claire
Carlos Bardem as Luis
Jean-Pierre Mocky as Father
André Wilms : German

Notes
The memory scenes of Martin's childhood in Los Angeles are derived from Demy's mother, Agnès Varda's 1981 film Documenteur, in which Demy appeared as a child.

References

External links
 
 

2011 films
2010s French-language films
2010s Spanish-language films
French drama films
2011 drama films
Films shot in Paris
Films shot in Mexico
Films shot in Los Angeles
English-language French films
Spanish-language French films
2010s English-language films
2011 multilingual films
French multilingual films
2010s French films